This is a list of the National Register of Historic Places listings in Tyler County, Texas.

This is intended to be a complete list of properties listed on the National Register of Historic Places in Tyler County, Texas. There are three properties listed on the National Register in the county. One property is also a Recorded Texas Historic Landmark.

Current listings

The locations of National Register properties may be seen in a mapping service provided.

|}

See also

National Register of Historic Places listings in Texas
Recorded Texas Historic Landmarks in Tyler County

References

External links

 
Tyler County